Anne Cross (born 16 April 1964) is an Australian former long-distance runner. She competed in the women's 5000 metres at the 2000 Summer Olympics.

References

External links
 

1964 births
Living people
Athletes (track and field) at the 2000 Summer Olympics
Australian female long-distance runners
Olympic athletes of Australia
Athletes from Melbourne
20th-century Australian women
21st-century Australian women